Parisan (also Romanized as Parīsān) is a village in Irafshan Rural District, Ashar District, Mehrestan County, Sistan and Baluchestan Province, Iran. At the 2006 census, its population was 37, in 11 families.

References 

Populated places in Mehrestan County